Dark-Hunter is a term from a paranormal romance and fantasy series by Sherrilyn Kenyon. Kenyon began writing the series in 1986 in horror, fantasy and science fiction magazines.

Definition 
The Dark-Hunters are immortal warriors who sell their souls to the Greek goddess Artemis for an Act of Vengeance against the one who murdered them.[3] Once they've had their revenge, they are dedicated to defending mankind against Daimons (a psychic race cursed by Apollo)[4] and other preternatural enemies. 

She knew of Acheron's love and compassion for humans and his unwillingness to allow others to suffer when he could stop it. Knowing this, she created her immortal warriors and manipulated him into leading, training, and being responsible for them.
Not just anyone may become a Dark Hunter, nor is the process easy.

A person must die as the direct result of a terrible betrayal, such as their best friend or a family member killing them in a brutal way. At the moment of their death, their soul will cry out for vengeance loudly enough to be heard by Artemis on Mount Olympus. Upon arriving, she offers the person a choice: true death or trading their soul to her to be resurrected as a Dark Hunter. In exchange for their soul and service in her Dark Hunter army, Artemis gives them 24 hours to seek their revenge against those who betrayed them. After those 24 hours are up, they must do their duty to mankind and hunt down the Daimons that prey on the humans. 

When a Dark Hunter slays a Daimon, they release any human souls that the Daimon has stolen, provided that the Dark Hunter finds the Daimon fast enough. If the Daimon is not slain soon after taking the human's soul, the soul will die from being in the wrong vessel and be unable to pass onto whichever afterlife they were meant to go to upon their death. 

The Dark Hunters work individually, each of them having a territory to watch over. They cannot be in close proximity to each other for more than a short amount of time without draining each other's powers. Also, any physical harm caused by one Dark Hunter to another will cause the first Dark Hunter to suffer the same physical pain or hurt tenfold. 

The Dark Hunters are night dwelling immortals who cannot be in sunlight (as Apollo cursed the Daimons with not being able to go out in the sunlight so too did Artemis leave the Dark Hunters with the inability to stand sunlight). They were made to be similar to the Daimons that they hunt so that they would be better able to hunt, battle, and kill them. They have fangs, super sensitive senses, and various psychic powers.

Novels

Short stories and novelettes 
 "The Beginning" (2002)
 "Dragonswan" (July 1, 2002)
 "Phantom Lover", in the anthology Midnight Pleasures (November 2003)
 "A Dark-Hunter Christmas", also in the back of Dance with the Devil (December 2003)
 "Winter Born", in the anthology Stroke of Midnight (October 2004)
 "Second Chances", free giveaway (2005)
 "A Hard Day's Night-Searcher", in the anthology My Big Fat Supernatural Wedding (October 3, 2006)
 "Until Death We Do Part", in the anthology Love At First Bite (October 3, 2006)
 "Fear the Darkness", free e-book (January 2007)
 "Shadow of the Moon," in the anthology "Dead after Dark" (December 1, 2008)

See also

 The Dark-Hunter, Dream-Hunter, Were-Hunter and Hellchaser Universe
 Sherrilyn Kenyon#Manga for the Japanese comic adaptation

References

External links 
 Official website.
 Sherrilyn Kenyon interview about the Dark-Hunter series at Crescent Blues.
 Year of Acheron

 
Fantasy novel series